Clinical and Experimental Pharmacology and Physiology is a peer-reviewed scientific journal that publishes articles relating to pharmacology and physiology.

Abstracting and indexing
 Academic Search
 Abstracts in Anthropology
 Elsevier BIOBASE 
 CAB Abstracts
 Chemical Abstracts Service
 Current Contents/ Clinical Medicine 
 Dairy Science Abstracts
 Medline
 Forestry Abstracts 
 Global Health
 Journal Citation Reports/ Science Edition 
 Science Citation Index
 Tropical Diseases Bulletin
 Weed Abstracts

Wiley-Blackwell academic journals
Pharmacology journals
English-language journals
Physiology journals
Monthly journals
Publications established in 1974